The 2012 Monte Carlo Rally, officially 80ème Rallye Automobile de Monte-Carlo was the first round of the 2012 World Rally Championship (WRC) season. The rally took place between 18 and 22 January 2012.

Report

Introduction
Stages were run in both daylight and at night, and the route included two passes through the famous Col de Turini stage on Saturday. The rally became the first in the modern era of the sport to be held over the course of five days. 82 entries were registered for the event.

Leg One (18 January)
2011 World Champion Sébastien Loeb took an early lead when he won the first stage of the rally, Le Moulinon–Antraigues. However, icy conditions on the second stage, Burzet–St Martial meant that Ford driver Jari-Matti Latvala took the lead when he adopted an unorthodox tyre strategy, using super-soft and studded tyres on opposite corners of his car. By the end of the stage, Latvala had established a thirty-second lead over Loeb. Latvala's lead was short-lived, as he crashed out on the second running of Burzet–St Martial when he missed a pace note warning that a corner tightened on entry. His car fell over a short drop, but could not be retrieved. Ford later confirmed that Latvala had retired from the rally, as the event was not run to "Rally 2" – formerly super-rally – regulations which would normally allow Latvala to restart the rally the next day.

Latvala's accident meant that Loeb reclaimed the lead of the rally, one minute ahead of Mini's Dani Sordo and Petter Solberg in the second works Ford Fiesta. Sébastien Ogier finished the day fourth in his Škoda Fabia S2000, which he credited to the mixed conditions minimising the differences in performance between the WRC and Super 2000 cars. Evgeny Novikov was fifth, the first of the privateer WRC cars.

Leg Two (19 January)
The second day of competition saw the running of six special stages, five of which were won by Loeb; Sordo won the second run over Labatie D'Andaure–Lalouvesc. Ogier crashed out of the rally on the final stage of the day, the second pass over Lamastre–Gilhoc–Alboussière. Ogier had been running sixth at the time of the accident. His co-driver, Julien Ingrassia, injured his arm in the crash, though the exact extent of his injuries was not revealed except to say that it was "not broken".

At the end of the second day, Loeb's lead over Sordo was one minute and thirty-seven seconds, with third-placed Solberg a further three seconds behind. Ford team principal Malcolm Wilson admitted that he felt Solberg was being "too conservative" with the car and encouraged him to chase Sordo as it was more important for Solberg to become familiar with the car's abilities than it was to score manufacturer points. Loeb's team-mate Mikko Hirvonen was a further two minutes behind Solberg, holding a narrow lead over Novikov.

Results

Event standings

* Only team eligible for SWRC points that was classified.

** These teams do not score points in PWRC.

Special stages

Power Stage
The "Power stage" was a  stage at the end of the rally, held between Ste-Agnes and Col de la Madone.

References

External links 
 The official website for the rally
 The official website of the World Rally Championship

Monte Carlo
Monte Carlo Rally
Rally
Monte Carlo Rally